Wang Huanyu (29 December 1954 – 4 November 2018) was a Chinese physicist who served as Communist Party Secretary and deputy director of the Institute of High Energy Physics, Chinese Academy of Sciences between March 2003 and October 2014. Wang made a significant contribution to China's lunar exploration project.

Biography
Wang was born in Wen'an County, Hebei, in December 1954. After graduating from the University of Science and Technology of China in November 1978, he was assigned to the Institute of High Energy Physics, Chinese Academy of Sciences, where he was Communist Party Secretary and deputy director between March 2003 and October 2014. He joined the Communist Party of China in September 1978.

Wang was a professor and doctoral supervisor at the University of Science and Technology of China. He was a managing director of the China Nuclear Instrument Association and Chinese Academy of Space Sciences. He was a deputy director of the Space exploration Specialized Committee.

On November 4, 2018, Wang died of a heart attack while he was making a presentation at an academic conference in Hefei, Anhui province.

Awards
 1998 Special Government Allowance
 2004 Second Prize of the National Science and Technology Progress Award and Army Science and Technology Progress Award
 2009 Special Prize of the National Science and Technology Progress Award
 2011 National Labor Medal

References

External links
 

1954 births
People from Langfang
2018 deaths
University of Science and Technology of China alumni
Physicists from Hebei
Chinese astrophysicists
Academic staff of the University of Science and Technology of China
Educators from Hebei